Bryozoology is a branch of zoology specializing in Bryozoa, commonly known as moss animals, a phylum of aquatic invertebrates that live in clonal colonies.

Organizations
The International Bryozoology Association was founded in August 1968 by 16 zoologists and paleozoologists in Stockholm.

Journals
 Annals of Bryozoology

Bryozoologists
 Samantha L.L. Hill
 Eliza Jelly
 Randolph Kirkpatrick
 Raymond C. Osburn
 Mary Dora Rogick
 Ehrhard Voigt
 Timothy S. Wood

References

 
Subfields of zoology